Kiʻilani Arruda (born April 13, 2002) is an American beauty pageant titleholder who was crowned Miss Teen USA 2020. Arruda had previously been crowned Miss Hawaii Teen USA 2020; she is the second entrant from Hawaii to have been crowned Miss Teen USA, following Kelly Hu who was crowned Miss Teen USA 1985.

Early life and education
Arruda was born on April 13, 2002, and is from Kapaa, Hawaii, on the island of Kauai. She is half Filipino. She has two younger siblings: a sister and a brother with autism, and Arruda became an advocate for autism awareness because of him. 

Arruda attended Island School in Lihue, where she was elected student body president and maintained a GPA of 4.0, graduating in 2020. While in high school, Arruda was additionally a member of her school's varsity volleyball, swim, and track and field teams. Prior to becoming Miss Teen USA, she was a freshman at the University of Puget Sound, studying molecular and cellular biology on a pre-medical track, with a minor in Spanish.

Pageantry
Arruda began her pageantry career after winning Miss Kauai Teen USA 2018, which allowed her to compete in Miss Hawaii Teen USA 2019, where she placed as the second runner-up and was selected as Miss Congeniality. She later returned to the competition the following year, and was crowned Miss Hawaii Teen USA 2020. 

As Miss Hawaii Teen USA, Arruda was awarded the opportunity to represent Hawaii at Miss Teen USA 2020. Originally slated for the spring of 2020, the competition was postponed due to the COVID-19 pandemic, and later held on November 7, 2020, at Graceland in Memphis, Tennessee. She competed in finals, where she was ultimately crowned as the winner by outgoing titleholder Kaliegh Garris, besting first runner-up Shayla Montgomery of Oregon. Following her win, she became the second entrant from Hawaii to win the competition, following Kelly Hu who had been crowned Miss Teen USA 1985, and the first winner to be born in the 21st century.

References

External links

2002 births
American beauty pageant winners
American people of Filipino descent
Autism activists
Hawaii people of Filipino descent
Living people
Miss Teen USA winners
People from Kauai County, Hawaii
University of Puget Sound alumni